The First Lady of Lao People's Democratic Republic, more commonly called the First Lady of Laos, is an unofficial title usually referring to the wife of the President of Laos.  While unofficial, the title is increasingly utilized in domestic and international protocol events. The title has also been attributed to the wife of the Prime Minister of Laos by some Laotian media outlets.

The present first lady of Laos is Naly Sisoulith, wife of President Thongloun Sisoulith, who has held the role since 2021.

List of first ladies

References